John Herbert Dickenson (June 11, 1931 – November 12, 2019) was a Canadian ice hockey left winger. He played in the NHL for the New York Rangers.

Dickenson was born in Hamilton, Ontario. He played in the Ontario Hockey Association with the Hamilton Aerovox in the 1948–49 hockey season, and the next two with the Guelph Biltmores. Scouted by the Rangers, he signed with them in 1951 and joined the Cincinnati Mohawks, their farm team. He played in 36 games for the Mohawks and scored 23 points. Dickenson also played 37 games for the Rangers in the 1951–52 season, scoring 14 goals and 13 assists for a total of 27 points.

In his second season with the Rangers, he sustained a career-ending eye injury at the age of 20 on November 5, 1952 in a game against the Toronto Maple Leafs when he was struck in the face by a shot. He was rushed to the hospital after being rendered unconscious and bleeding on the ice. He eventually lost sight in his right eye and never played another NHL game again. He later resided in Brantford, Ontario where he died in 2019 at the age of 88.

References

External links

1931 births
2019 deaths
Canadian ice hockey left wingers
Ice hockey people from Ontario
New York Rangers players
Sportspeople from Brantford
Sportspeople from Hamilton, Ontario